Beveridge is a Scottish surname. Notable people with the surname include:

Ada Beveridge (1875–1964), Australian leader of the Country Women's Association
Albert Beveridge (1862–1927), American historian and politician
Bill Beveridge (1909–1995), Canadian ice-hockey goaltender
Bob Beveridge (1909–1998), English cricketer
Christine Beveridge, Australian plant physiologist 
Corie Beveridge, Canadian female curler, 1996 World and Canadian champion
Crawford Beveridge (born 1947), Scottish businessman, Sun Microsystems
Daeida Wilcox Beveridge (1861–1914), co-developer of Hollywood, California
George D. Beveridge (1922–1987), American journalist
Gordon Beveridge (1933–1999), Scottish academic and university administrator
Graeme Beveridge (born 1976), Scottish rugby union player
Henry Beveridge (1837–1929), English civil servant and orientalist
James Beveridge (1917–1993), Canadian filmmaker, author and educator 
Jane Marsh Beveridge (1915–1998), Canadian filmmaker, educator and sculptor
John Beveridge (mayor) (1848–1916), New South Wales businessman and Alderman
John Lourie Beveridge (1824–1910), American politician, Governor of Illinois 1873–1877
Judith Beveridge (born 1956), Australian poet, editor and academic
Luke Beveridge (born 1970), Australian rules footballer and coach
Rabbie Beveridge (1877–1901), Scottish footballer
Rob Beveridge (born 1970), Australian basketball coach
William Beveridge (bishop) (1637–1708), English Bishop of St Asaph
William Beveridge (footballer) (1858–1941), Scottish footballer and athlete
William Beveridge (1879–1963), British economist and social reformer
William Ian Beardmore Beveridge (1908–2006), Australian animal pathologist

First name
 Beveridge C. Dunlop (1879–1961), New York politician

See also
Beveridge, Victoria, town in Victoria, Australia
Beveridge, California, unincorporated community in California, United States
Beveridge curve
Beveridge Locks, canal locks connecting the Tay River to the Rideau Canal Waterway in Drummond/North Elmsley, Ontario, Canada
Beveridge Reef
Beveridge Report

Scottish surnames